Sudan is a sub-district located in al-Radmah District, Ibb Governorate, Yemen. Sudan had a population of 7014 according to the 2004 census.

Villages 

 Maswara village
 Sha'ab al-Sanaf village
 Al-Mawrah village
 Dar Sudan village
 Dar al-Anab village
 Haid al-Hajroup village
 Dha Ashra'a village
 Ma'azoub al-Azab village

References 

Sub-districts in Ar Radmah District